is Nana Kitade's fourth single and her first double A-side single. It debuted at #60 and charted for three weeks on the Oricon Charts. The song "Pureness" was featured as the first ending theme to the Shounen anime Beet the Vandel Buster.

Music video
The music video for "Pureness" shows Kitade playing live with her band in a dark club, with scenes of her singing against a red leather background.

There is no music video for "Nanairo". It also did not appear on any album and is found only on its single.

Track listing
Pureness - 3:50
 - 4:16
Pureness (Instrumental) - 3:50
Nanairo (Instrumental) - 4:16

Charts

2004 songs
Nana Kitade songs
Songs written by Nana Kitade
2004 singles
Sony Music Entertainment Japan singles